Jim March (born 21 April 1954) is a Scottish former footballer, who played for Airdrieonians and Ayr United in the Scottish Football League during the 1970s and 1980s. Most of his league appearances were made with Airdrieonians, who he played for in  the 1975 Scottish Cup Final.

External links

1954 births
Living people
Scottish footballers
Airdrieonians F.C. (1878) players
Ayr United F.C. players
Scottish Football League players
Association football forwards
Footballers from Glasgow
St Roch's F.C. players
Pollok F.C. players
Scottish Junior Football Association players